Fool on the Hill is the fourth studio album by Sérgio Mendes and Brasil '66 released in 1968.

This is the first album featuring the second edition of Brasil '66. Mendes replaced all of the original band members (with the exception of lead singer Lani Hall).  The dismissed members went on to form the short-lived group, The Carnival, which released one self-titled album in 1969. This is also the first appearance of Gracinha Leporace in a Sérgio Mendes album.

The album features two top 10 pop singles: the title track and "Scarborough Fair". The Simon & Garfunkel cover was featured in both the trailer and the soundtrack for the 1973 film Heavy Traffic.

Track listing
"The Fool on the Hill" (John Lennon, Paul McCartney) – 3:15
"Festa" (Dori Caymmi, Paulo César Pinheiro, Lani Hall) – 4:18
"Casa Forte" (Edu Lobo) – 4:04
"Canto Triste" (Lobo, Vinícius de Moraes, Hall) – 4:17
"Upa, Neguinho"  (Lobo, Gianfrancesco Guarnieri) – 2:54
"Lapinha"  (Baden Powell, Paulo César Pinheiro) – 3:08
"Scarborough Fair" (Traditional, arranged by Paul Simon and Art Garfunkel) – 3:19
"When Summer Turns To Snow"  (Dave Grusin, Alan and Marilyn Bergman) – 5:07
"Laia Ladaia" (Reza) (Lobo, Ruy Guerra, Norman Gimbel) – 3:13

Personnel
Sérgio Mendes – Piano, vocals, arranger, producer
Lani Hall – Vocals
Karen Philipp – Vocals
John Pisano – Guitar
Rubens Bassini – Percussion
Sebastiao Neto – Percussion
Dom Um Romao – Percussion, drums
Gracinha Leporace (shown as "Leporael" on the original album cover credits) – Vocal on "Lapinha"
Oscar Castro-Neves – Guitar on "Lapinha"

Production
Sérgio Mendes – Producer, Arranger
Dave Grusin – Orchestra Arranger, Conductor
Henry Lewy, Herb Alpert, Larry Levine – Engineer
Tom Wilkes – Art Direction
Guy Webster – Photography
Bob Gordan – Photography (Figure Study)

Charts

Certifications

References

1968 albums
Sérgio Mendes albums
German-language albums
Albums conducted by Dave Grusin
Albums arranged by Dave Grusin
Albums arranged by Sérgio Mendes
Albums produced by Sérgio Mendes
Albums recorded at A&M Studios
Albums recorded at Wally Heider Studios
A&M Records albums